Belehzin-e Sofla (also Romanized as Belehzīn-e Soflá and Belezīn-e Soflá) is a village in Badr Rural District, in the Central District of Ravansar County, Kermanshah Province, Iran. At the 2006 census, its population was 35, in 8 families.

References 

Populated places in Ravansar County